This is a list of current and former Roman Catholic churches in the Roman Catholic Diocese of Paterson. The diocese covers the counties of Passaic, Morris, and Sussex in northern New Jersey.

Paterson

Clifton

Paterson

Other areas

References

 
Paterson